Tommy Flanders was lead vocalist in the Blues Project for several periods in the band's history from 1966 to 1972.

He appears on two Blues Project albums, their debut Live at the Cafe Au Go Go (Verve Folkways, 1966) and a reunion album eponymously titled Blues Project (Capitol Records, 1972), as well as on various compilations and greatest hits collections.

After his first departure from the Blues Project in 1966 (Flanders left before the debut album was issued), he signed with Verve Forecast, for whom he issued two commercially unsuccessful singles and one largely ignored album, The Moonstone (1969). In a review at AllMusic, rock journalist Richie Unterberger panned the album, saying, "Despite some top-flight backup musicians in Bruce Langhorne, Dick Rosmini, and Jerry Scheff, it was a fairly forgettable record, and certainly a low-energy one, the mellowness threatening to dissolve into sleepiness. It's one of those albums where nothing's especially wrong, but neither is anything especially right."

His 1967 Verve Forecast single, "Friday Night City" c/w "Bad Reputation," was produced by former Bob Dylan-producer Tom Wilson. Both sides featured Frank Zappa (then of the Mothers of Invention) on guitar, and Zappa reportedly arranged and conducted both sessions as well. ("Friday Night City" was composed by Flanders; "Bad Reputation" by Tim Hardin.) Flanders' final solo release was a single, "First Time, Last Time" c/w "Between Purple and Blue," issued on MGM in 1970.

He later went into artist management; his clients included Carolyne Mas.

References

The Blues Project members
American rock singers
20th-century American male musicians